Valentines is an unincorporated community located in Brunswick County, in the U.S. state of Virginia.

Mason-Tillett House was listed on the National Register of Historic Places in 2004.  There is also a combined store and post office, but no other businesses or services.

References

Unincorporated communities in Brunswick County, Virginia